Sergey Yevgenyevich Naryshkin (born 27 October 1954) is a Russian politician and businessman who has served as the director of the Foreign Intelligence Service since 2016. Previously, he was Chairman of the State Duma (2011–2016) and Kremlin Chief of Staff (2008–2012); he was also chairman of the Historical Truth Commission in May 2009 until it was dissolved in February 2012.

Early life and education
Sergei Yevgenyevich Naryshkin was born in Leningrad and graduated from Leningrad Institute of Mechanics with a degree in engineering in 1978, and, in 1978, he was the first secretary of its Komsomol which was the Communist Party's youth wing. From 1978, Naryshkin studied at the Moscow Higher School of the KGB for two years in the French section while Nikolay Tokarev also studied at the Higher School of the KGB at the same time. In the 1990s he also graduated from International Management Institute of Saint Petersburg with a degree in economics.

In 2015, Naryshkin's dissertation in economics was exposed as fraudulent in an investigation by Dissernet, with more than half of the text plagiarized from other publications.

Career

In 1982, Naryshkin was appointed Deputy Vice-Rector of the Leningrad Polytechnical Institute. From 1988 to 1992, he worked in the Soviet Embassy in Brussels as an expert in the State Committee on Science and Technologies in the office of the economic adviser, but Alexei Pastyukhov, a childhood friend, stated that Naryshkin worked as third secretary. Some sources suggest that while there he began to work for the KGB after he had been at a group of the KGB Higher School where he and Vladimir Putin were fellow students.

Municipal and Oblast political staffer (1992-2004)
From 1992 until 1995, he worked in the Committee for Economy and Finance of Saint Petersburg Mayor Office. After he left, he became the chief of the external investment department of Promstroybank—a position he would hold until 1997. From 1997 until 1998, Naryshkin led the Investment Department of the Leningrad Oblast government. From 1998 until 2004, he was the Chairman of the Committee for External Economic and International Relations of the government of Leningrad Oblast.

Deputy Prime Minister (External affairs) and siloviki (2004-2008)
In early 2004, he was a deputy head of the economic department of the Russian presidential administration. From March through September 2004, Naryshkin was a deputy chief of staff of the Russian government.

Since 2004, he has been a member of the board of directors of Sovkomflot and a deputy chairman of the board of directors of Rosneft. Since 31 August 2004, Naryshkin has also been Chairman of the Board of Directors of Channel One of the Russian television.

Since 13 September 2004, he has been a Minister, Chief of Staff of the Government of Russia. On 15 February 2007, President Vladimir Putin announced that Naryshkin had been appointed Deputy Prime Minister of Russia for external economic activity, focusing on collaboration with the Commonwealth of Independent States.

Presidential Chieftain (2008-2011)
In May 2008, Naryshkin was appointed chief of the Presidential Administration of Russia.

In May 2009, President Dmitry Medvedev appointed him chairman of the Historical Truth Commission.

Chairman of the State Duma (2011-2016)

Naryshkin was elected to the State Duma, the lower house of the Russian parliament in December 2011. When the Duma began meeting for its new term on 21 December 2011, Naryshkin was elected as Chairman of the State Duma; he received 238 votes in favor of his candidacy, while 88 deputies opposed him.

In June 2012, Naryshkin signed a resolution on setting up a culture council under the State Duma speaker. The council is “a standing advisory body”. The tasks of the council are “the examination and drafting of initiatives on topical problems of legislative regulations in culture and associated industries, the development of recommendations on culture for the use in lawmaking”.

On 2 September 2013, Naryshkin stated that there are no political prisoners in today's Russia.

Since the rise of tensions between European Union and Russia in 2014, Naryshkin was perceived as one of the main coordinators of contacts with European far-right and far-left parties supporting Russian foreign policy in Europe.

2014 sanctions
As a result of the 2014 Crimean crisis, the federal government of the United States under Barack Obama blacklisted Naryshkin and other close friends of the Russian president, including Sergei Ivanov and Gennadi Timchenko. Nevertheless, he officially visited the U.S., along with other Russian top security chiefs, at the end of January 2018.

Chief of Foreign Intelligence Service (2016)
In September 2016, Naryshkin was appointed as chief of Russia's Foreign Intelligence Service (SVR).

2022 Russo-Ukrainian conflict
In November 2021, Naryshkin dismissed reports of a possible invasion of Ukraine asserting that it was "malicious propaganda by the US State Department".

Days before Russia invaded Ukraine in February 2022, Naryshkin received widespread attention in the global press for visibly trembling and "stutter[ing] uncomfortably" as Putin humiliated him publicly for "fumbling" his response to the Russian President's questioning during a Security Council of Russia meeting concerning recognizing the Russian-backed separatist regions of Donetsk and Luhansk.

Membership in advisory and scientific councils and commissions 
Naryshkin is the Chairman of the Board of Trustees of the Russian Presidential Academy of National Economy and Public Administration (RANEPA).

Awards and honors
Russia
 Order of Merit to the Fatherland, 3rd class (2010)
 Order of Merit to the Fatherland, 4th class (4 June 2008)
 Order of Alexander Nevsky (27 October 2014)
 Order of Honour (27 October 2004)
 Order of Friendship (2016)
 Medal of the Order "For Merit to the Fatherland", 2nd class (11 March 2003)
 Russian Federation Presidential Certificate of Honour (26 October 2009)
 Honorary Diploma of the Government of the Russian Federation (26 October 2009)
 Certificate of Honor of the Central Election Commission of the Russian Federation (2 April 2008)
 Order of St. Sergius of Radonezh, 2nd class (2014)
 Medal "In Memory of the 350th Anniversary of Irkutsk" (2011)
 Medal "For Contribution to Strengthening the Defense of the Russian Federation" (2021)
 Order of Saint Anna, 1st class (2009)

Foreign countries
 Order of Honor (2015, Armenia)
 Dostlug Order (2012, Azerbaijan)
 Order of Honor (2015, Belarus)
 Order of the Friendship of Peoples (2009, Belarus)
 Officer of the Legion of Honour (2013, France)
 Order of Friendship, 2nd class (2016, Kazakhstan)
 Order of Neutrality of the President of Turkmenistan (2012, Turkmenistan)
 Friendship Order (2021, Vietnam)

Notes

References

External links
 

1954 births
Living people
1st class Active State Councillors of the Russian Federation
Politicians from Saint Petersburg
Businesspeople from Saint Petersburg
Directors of the Foreign Intelligence Service (Russia)
Kremlin Chiefs of Staff
Medvedev Administration personnel
United Russia politicians
Recipients of the Order "For Merit to the Fatherland", 3rd class
Recipients of the Order of Honour (Russia)
Officiers of the Légion d'honneur
21st-century Russian politicians
Chairmen of the State Duma
Russian individuals subject to the U.S. Department of the Treasury sanctions
Sixth convocation members of the State Duma (Russian Federation)
Seventh convocation members of the State Duma (Russian Federation)
Recipients of the Order "For Merit to the Fatherland", 4th class
Recipients of the Order of Alexander Nevsky
Recipients of the Medal of the Order "For Merit to the Fatherland" II class
Recipients of the Order of St. Anna, 1st class
Recipients of the Friendship Order